Ambala–Daulatpur Chowk DEMU is a passenger express train of the Indian Railways connecting  in Haryana and  Daulatpur Chowk in Himachal Pradesh. It is currently being operated with 74991/74992 train numbers on daily basis.

Route and halts

Average speed and frequency
The train runs with an average speed of 41 km/h and completes 213 km in 5 hrs 30 mim. The train runs twice a day.

See also 

 Amb Andaura railway station
 Ambala Cantonment Junction railway station

External links 
 74991/Ambala - Amb Andaura DEMU
 74992/Amb Andaura - Ambala DEMU

References

Rail transport in Haryana
Rail transport in Himachal Pradesh
Diesel–electric multiple units of India
Transport in Ambala